Project Alpha can mean:

 Project Alpha (hoax), a parapsychology hoax
 Project Alpha (military), a discontinued U.S. military project
 Project Alpha (non-proliferation effort), a nuclear non-proliferation project
 Project Alpha (police), a Metropolitan Police Service project

See also 
 Operation Alfa
 Operation Alpha